Kreitman may refer to:

People with the surname
Esther Kreitman (1891-1954), British novelist.
Hyman Kreitman (1914-2001), British businessman.
Martin Kreitman, American geneticist.
Norman Kreitman (1927-2012), Scottish psychiatrist.

Other
McDonald–Kreitman test